Zoe Fairbairns (born 1948) is a British feminist writer who has authored novels, short stories, radio plays and political pamphlets.

Biography

Zoe Fairbairns was born in 1948, and educated at St. Andrews University, Scotland, and the College of William and Mary, US. She was the poetry editor for Spare Rib, in the same decade working as part of a collective of women writers to produce Tales I Tell My Mother. Fairbairns has worked as a freelance journalist and a creative writing tutor; she has also held appointments as Writer in Residence at Bromley Schools (1981–83 and 1985–89), Deakin University, Geelong, Australia (1983), Sunderland Polytechnic (1983–85) and Surrey County Council (1989). More recently she has worked as a subtitler and audio describer. She lives in South London and currently teaches Creative Writing at City Lit.

Fiction

Fairbairns is best known for her novels, especially Benefits (1979), Stand We at Last (1983), Here Today (1984) and Closing (1987).

Live as Family, Fairbairns' debut, was published when the author was just 19. A contemporary re-working of the Jane Eyre idea, it brought Fairbairns significant attention. Down (1969), has a first-person male narrator; it was followed by Benefits, a dystopia imagining life in Britain in the future, with a political party in power that has undone the work of feminism and returned women to the home. It has been compared to Margaret Atwood's later The Handmaid's Tale. Stand We at Last is a historical novel written from a feminist perspective; it politically subverts the form of the family saga, in the same way that Here Today is a crime novel, while pushing the genre to its limits.  This novel asks questions about female identity in the contemporary world, and depicts the marginalisation of 'temps' owing to new technology. Closing traces the lives of women who meet at a sales training course, and argues that capitalism can have benefits for the women's movement. The three 1980s novels were commercially successful, and Here Today won the Fawcett Book Prize. Daddy's Girls (1992) is, like Stand We At Last, a family saga that spotlights women in society, but in a more recent world. Other Names (1998) shows the effects of both the Lloyd's financial crisis, and a typical philanderer, on two women of different generations.

Themes, influences

Zoe Fairbairns' work generally embraces realism, and much of it is set in the contemporary world, with an authentic material and economic backdrop.  She authentically reproduces dialogue, and focuses on her characters' jobs.  A feminist writer, almost all her work has women as the lead characters. The settings and themes of her novels link her to Fay Weldon, Pat Barker, Margaret Drabble and Doris Lessing.

Other writings

Zoe Fairbairns has also focused on the short story as a form. This began with her work as a collective contributor to Tales I Tell My Mother and More Tales I Tell My Mother; she published her own collection, How Do You Pronounce Nulliparous (2004) and Write Short Stories and Get Them Published (2011). She has written pamphlets for CND, Shelter, and the feminist publishers Raw Nerve; a radio play (The Belgian Nurse), introductions to novels, interviews with authors including Fay Weldon and Jo Nesbo for Books Magazine, and fiction reviews for newspapers.

Bibliography

Novels

Live as Family  (1968)
Down: An Explanation (1969)
Benefits (1979)
Stand We at Last (1983)
Here Today (1984)
Closing (1987)
Daddy's Girls (1992)
Other Names (1998)

Selected Short Stories

Tales I Tell My Mother (1978) (Contributor)
More Tales I Tell My Mother (1986) (Contributor)
How Do You Pronounce Nulliparous (2004)

References

Further reading

 Alexander, Flora. Contemporary Women Novelists. London: Edward Arnold, 1989
 Carver, Raymond, "A Storyteller’s Shop Talk", New York Times, 15 February 1981.
 Domínguez García, Beatriz. "La narración en primera persona: Un nuevo espacio narrativo en Other Names de Zöe Fairbairns y Emotionally Weird by Kate Atkinson".  Cuder Domínguez, Pilar (ed. and intro.); Gallego Durán, Mar (ed. and intro.), and Pérez Vides, Auxiliadora (ed. and intro.), Espacios de género. Coleccion Alfar/Universidad 129. Seville: Alfar, 2005. 301–10.
 Domínguez García, Beatriz.  "The Retelling of History through Her Story". Lázaro, Alberto (ed. and preface), The Road from George Orwell: His Achievement and Legacy. Bern: Peter Lang, 2001. 139–56.
 Duncker, Patricia. Sisters and Strangers: An Introduction to Contemporary Feminist Fiction. Oxford: Blackwell, 1992.
 Figes, Kate. "Salvation on the screen; The Books Interview; What does a career novelist do when writer's block strikes? Zoe Fairbairns talks to Kate Figes". The Independent", 22 August 1998, Features. 15.
 Fitting, Peter. "The Turn from Utopia in Recent Feminist Fiction".  Jones, Libby Falk (ed.); Goodwin, Sarah Webster (ed.); Pfaelzer, Jean (response) and Elshtain, Jean Bethke (response). Feminism, Utopia, and Narrative. Tennessee Studies in Literature (TStL) 32. Knoxville: University of Tennessee Press, 1990. 141–58.
 Kinsky-Ehritt, Andrea. "(Re-)Considering the Past: Zoë Fairbairns's Stand We at Last". Neumeier, Beate (ed. and intro.), Engendering Realism and Postmodernism: Contemporary Writers in Britain. Postmodern Studies (PmdnS) 32. Amsterdam, Netherlands: Rodopi, 2001. 117–27.
 Palmer, Paulina.  "The City in Contemporary Women's Fiction". Massa, Ann, and Alistair Stead (eds), Forked Tongues? Comparing Twentieth-Century British and American Literature. London: Longman, 1994. 315–35.
 Pykett, Lyn.  "The Century's Daughters: Recent Women's Fiction and History". Critical Quarterly: 29.3 (1987): 71–77.

External links
 Author's website.
 Full bibliography and critical perspective on British Council Contemporary Writers Database:

1948 births
Living people
Academics of the University of Sunderland
Alumni of the University of St Andrews
British editors
British women editors
British women journalists
British journalists
British writers
British feminist writers
College of William & Mary alumni
Academic staff of Deakin University
People from London
Surrey County Council
Writers from London